
Gmina Miączyn is a rural gmina (administrative district) in Zamość County, Lublin Voivodeship, in eastern Poland.

The gmina contains part of the protected area called Skierbieszów Landscape Park.

Villages
Gmina Miączyn contains the villages and settlements of Czartoria, Frankamionka, Gdeszyn, Gdeszyn-Kolonia, Horyszów, Horyszów-Kolonia, Koniuchy, Koniuchy-Kolonia, Kotlice, Kotlice-Kolonia, Miączyn, Miączyn-Kolonia, Miączyn-Stacja, Ministrówka, Niewirków, Niewirków-Kolonia, Poddąbrowa, Podkotlice, Świdniki, Zawalów, Zawalów-Kolonia and Żuków.

Neighbouring gminas
Gmina Miączyn is bordered by the gminas of Grabowiec, Komarów-Osada, Sitno, Trzeszczany, Tyszowce and Werbkowice.

References

Polish official population figures 2006

Miaczyn
Zamość County